Life of Alexander Nevsky (Zhitiye Aleksandra Nevskovo) is a Russian literary work of the late 13th and early 14th centuries.

It describes the life and achievements of Alexander Nevsky, a Russian ruler and a military leader, who defended the northern borders of Rus against the Swedish invasion, defeated the Teutonic knights at the Lake Chud in 1242 and paid a few visits to Batu Khan to protect the Vladimir-Suzdal Principality from the Khazar raids. The work is filled with 'patriotic spirit' and achieves a 'high degree of artistic expressiveness' in its description of Alexander's heroic deeds and those of his warriors.

External links
 Translation into modern Russian by the Federal Fund of Science Courses
 Audio recording of the full text

East Slavic literature
Medieval literature
Life of Alexander Nevsky